Cassius Clay (soon Muhammad Ali) and Doug Jones fought a ten-round boxing match at Madison Square Garden in New York City, on March 13, 1963. Clay won the bout on points through a close but unanimous decision.

Viewership and revenue
The fight was Madison Square Garden's first boxing sellout in 13 years, grossing a live gate of $304,943 ($ inflation adjusted). The fight purses were $90,000 ($ inflation adjusted) for Clay and $75,000 for Jones.

The fight had a closed-circuit theatre television broadcast, which drew 150,000 pay-per-view buys, including 9,000 in Texas and 1,500 at Syria Mosque. The fight grossed $500,000 ($ inflation adjusted) in closed-circuit television revenue. In addition, the fight also had a pay-per-view home television broadcast in Toronto and Hartford, Connecticut. The fight's combined live gate and closed-circuit revenue was $ ($ inflation adjusted).

References

Jones
1963 in boxing
March 1963 sports events in the United States
 Pay-per-view boxing matches